Schmutz may refer to:

Charlie Schmutz (1891–1962), American Major League pitcher
Gottfried Schmutz (born 1954), Swiss road racing cyclist
Olivier Schmutz (born 1971), Swiss judoka
Schmutz (film), 1987 Austrian film